Vanisha Karishma Kumar (born 5 February 1995) is a footballer who plays as a forward or midfielder. Born in Australia, she is a member of the Fiji women's national team. In 2015 she represented Fiji in the 2015 Pacific Games.

Kumar was born in Sydney, Australia and has been playing soccer since the age of 11. At the age of 15 ahe had an opportunity to try out for the Australia national team but declined so she could play for the Fiji national team.

References

Living people
1995 births
Fijian people of Indian descent
Australian people of Indo-Fijian descent
Sportspeople of Indian descent
Australian women's soccer players
Soccer players from Sydney
Fijian women's footballers
Fiji women's international footballers
Women's association football forwards
Women's association football midfielders